Jafarabad (also Romanized as Ja‘farābād) is a village in Pas Kalut Rural District, in the Central District of Gonabad County, Razavi Khorasan Province, Iran. At the 2006 census, its population was 53, in 17 families.

References 

Populated places in Gonabad County